Cheshmeqan (also Romanized as Cheshmeqān, Chashmaqān, and Cheshmaqān; also known as Chashmaghan, Chasmaqān, Chechmukhan, Cheshmagān, Cheshmeshān, and Chishmushan) is a village in Jushin Rural District, Kharvana District, Varzaqan County, East Azerbaijan Province, Iran. At the 2006 census, its population was 10, in 4 families.

References 

Towns and villages in Varzaqan County